The Wilhelmsblick in the Harz Mountains of central Germany is a viewing point near the village of Treseburg in the Bode Gorge in the county of Harz, Saxony-Anhalt. From this single point, four different stretches of the River Bode may be seen as it swings in great loops around the spur on which the viewing point is located.

Location 
The Wilhelmsblick lies within the Harz/Saxony-Anhalt Nature Park about 1,000 metres (as the crow flies) north-northwest of the junction of the Landesstraße 94 (Altenbrak–Treseburg) and the L 93 (Allrode–Treseburg–Wienrode) in Treseburg, the last-named road being linked to Thale via the nearby Kreisstraße 1350. The stretches of river either side of the ridge come within just 150 m of one another.

The Wilhelmsblick is no. 66 in the system of checkpoints in the Harzer Wandernadel hiking network.

References

External links 
 Der Wilhelmsblick at harzlife.de

Thale
Scenic viewpoints
Outdoor structures in Germany
Tourist attractions in Saxony-Anhalt